Savolitinib is an experimental small molecule inhibitor of c-Met. It is being investigated for the treatment of cancer by AstraZeneca. It is in phase II clinical trials for adenocarcinoma, non-small cell lung cancer, and renal cell carcinoma. It has been given conditional approval for these indication in China.

References

External links 
 

AstraZeneca brands
Tyrosine kinase inhibitors
Pyrazoles
Imidazopyridines
Experimental cancer drugs